Giovanni Aloi (born 1976) is an author and curator specializing in the representation of nature in modern and contemporary art. He teaches art history and visual culture at School of the Art Institute of Chicago. He is the Founder and Editor in Chief of Antennae: The Journal of Nature in Visual Culture and is the co-editor of the University of Minnesota Press book series Art after Nature. Aloi is also USA correspondent for Esse Magazine Art+Opinion.

Education
Aloi studied history of art and art practice in Milan at the Liceo Artistico S. Marta and moved to London in 1997 where he gained a BTEC in Photographic Studies and Printing Technique at the London College of Communication. He then furthered his education at Goldsmiths University with a Post Graduate Diploma in Art History (2003), an MA in Visual Culture (2004), and Ph.D. on the subject of Natural History and Contemporary Art (2014).

Career
Aloi has worked in different capacities for some of the most important museums and galleries in the UK and the US. Between 1999 and 2004, Aloi worked in the Education Department at Whitechapel Art Gallery. While in 2007 he began to work at Tate Galleries in London as associate faculty.

At the same time, Aloi taught Modern and Contemporary Art at Queen Mary University of London (2006-2014), Roehampton University (2009-2013), and Sotheby's Institute of Art (2012 to today).

Radio, TV, and presentations
In 2013, Aloi contributed to a documentary film titled Royal Pets: One's Best Friend, part of a series The Royals.
In July 2014, Aloi contributed to the BBC Radio 3 program titled Animals and Anthropomorphism along with animal-studies expert Susan McHugh and novelist Karen Joy Fowler. In June 2015, Aloi also contribute to a BBC Radio 4 program titled Butterflies. And in 2016, he contributed to the episode of the same series dedicated to the lobster in art and culture. In 2020, Aloi was interviewed by Ferren Gipson for Art Matters Podcast, Art UK. In 2021, Aloi was in conversation on WLPN with co-curator and artist Andrew Yang about the exhibition Earthly Observatory.

Aloi has regularly presented papers in institutions like the Getty Center, New York Botanic Garden, Dulwich Picture Gallery, Natural History Museum in London, Tate Modern, The Royal Institute of Great Britain, Cambridge University, The Art Institute of Chicago, The Chicago Museum of Contemporary Art and the Courtauld Institute of Art.

Conferences
Aloi has organized and chaired symposia on the subject of nature and posthumanism in modern and contemporary art. Animal Ecologies in Visual Culture was held in 2011 at UCL in London. The symposium proposed an exploration of artistic practices involved with animals and environments. Through a multidisciplinary approach, it aimed at facilitating a dialogue between artists, scientists, and academics interested in informing wider audiences through visual communication. In 2012, With Professor Anthony Podbersceck, Aloi co-organized ISAZ2012, held between 11 and 13 July 2012, Murray Edwards College, Cambridge, UK.

In 2016, with artist Andrew Yang and art historian David Getsy, Aloi co-organized and chaired the symposium Human-non-Human Networks held at The School of the Art Institute of Chicago on the 12th of March. The symposium critically addressed the zoocentrism characterizing the recent years of animal studies to identify new and productive methodological approaches and ethicalities for the biotechnological and biocapital dimensions of the Anthropocene.

In 2017, Aloi organized and co-chaired Truth.Climate.Now. Representation, policies, and lived experiences of the Anthropocene were central to this symposium that through the collaboration of artists and scientists working at the School of the Art Institute of Chicago mapped new aesthetic territories for current political times.

Also, in 2017, Aloi organized and chaired the symposium titled Botanical Speculations at The School of the Art Institute of Chicago. Botanical Speculations brought together the artistic and scientific community of the School of the Art Institute of Chicago to discuss the growing importance of plants in contemporary art and philosophy. The symposium featured the participation of many artists, faculties, and students from the School of the Art Institute of Chicago and a keynote presentation by Ikerbasque Research Professor of Philosophy at the University of the Basque Country, Vitoria-Gasteiz, Michael Marder. The proceedings of this symposium were gathered in the edited collection Botanical Speculations published in 2018.

In 2019, Aloi was invited to the Getty Center in LA to moderate a discussion about the presence of animals in contemporary art with artists Kate Clark, Claire Owen, and poet Donika Kelly.

In 2019, following the symposium by the same name, Aloi launched the Botanical Speculations Discussion Group. A quasi-monthly, online meeting open to the public in which the work of artists focussing on plants is discussed.

In 2021, Aloi has organized multiple discussion panels with artists and scholars in conjunction with the exhibition Earthly Observatory he co-curated with Andrew Yang.

Research and curatorial work
Aloi's research focuses on the representation of the natural world in modern and contemporary art with an emphasis on the materiality of art objects, empathy, climate change, extinction, and sustainability. His early career mostly focussed on the field of animal-studies. In 2014, after relocating to Chicago, his research focus shifted to Anthropocene-studies and more recently to critical plant-studies. Another substantial area of interest in Aloi's research is the history of the art market and how economic factors impact art making and art writing.

In 2014, Aloi was invited by Jody Berland, Professor in the Department of Humanities at York University to join an international team of researchers working on the subject of animals and digital interfaces. The project, sponsored by the Social sciences and Humanities Research Council of Canada focuses on "the current proliferation and re-configuration of the animal that occurs in the context of a global visual culture that relies on images of animals to signify, promote, destabilize and secure its political, cultural, and natural landscapes". As part of this project, Aloi co-curated a two-venue exhibition with curator Matthew Brower, of the University of Toronto. The Digital Animalities exhibition took place in Toronto across the exhibiting spaces of Aird Gallery and Contact Gallery. Digital Animalities featured the work of many artists whose practice focuses on the productivities and challenges presented by digital interfaces. Artists included in the exhibition: Julie Andreyev, Simon Lysander Overstall, Jonathon Keats, Gwen MacGregor, Neozoon, Ken Rinaldo, Lou Sheppard, Donna Szoke, Sara Angelucci, Ingrid Bachmann, Maria Fernanda Cardoso, Wally Dion, and Aki Inomata.

Between 2019 and 2021 Aloi has co-curated Earthly Observatory with Andrew Yang. The exhibition brought into dialogue works from local and internationally renowned artists as well as SAIC alumni and faculty and was expressly designed to encourage visitors and students to rethink their conceptions of materiality, agency, empathy, subjectivity, and community at a time of unprecedented ecological crisis and cultural change. The large-scale exhibition included the work of more than 30 artists, including, among others, Edgar Heap of Birds, Nandipha Mntambo, Ken Rinaldo, Mark Dion, and Terry Evans. The exhibition received positive reviews and was listed in Time Out Chicago as a must-see show for Autumn 2021.

In the Summer of 2022, Aloi curated Animal Crossing in collaboration with artist Maria Bronkema for Fountain House Gallery in New York. Animal Crossing aims to educate the public and encourage society to celebrate our planet’s diverse wildlife. From wild animals to domestic companions, relating to animals can be a humbling experience that helps generate empathy for oneself and for others. As we learn more about each animal, we get an intimate glimpse of why we experience transference with them. An elephant might represent our aunt, a nurturer. The weasel is an amazing trickster – a hunter all year round. At home, we transfer feelings to our pets as they become our child, friend, and companion. All our intimate experiences are evident in our art of animals in the wild and from home that we choose to create and share. Animals intersect with us in multiple ways: culturally (symbolically through mascots, national flags, folklore), spiritually, and physically (animals in an urban environment, wildlife preserves, etc.) How would you feel if this animal disappeared? Finding ways to preserve the ecological balance is an urgent call to action, and highlighting our special connection with animals will aid us in preserving them and the environment.

Between 2020 and 2022 Aloi curated Lucian Freud: Plant Portraits. Based on his book Lucian Freud Herbarium, the exhibition emphasized Freud’s ability to capture the elusive essence of plants in original ways, exploring how he granted plants the same gravitas and carnality as his human subjects.

Freud was neither a plant lover nor did he have a “green thumb”. His gaze was rarely attracted to flowers—it was weeds and the straggly potted plants that followed him from home to home throughout his life that captured his imagination. This propensity to find beauty and truth in the seemingly unremarkable, the overlooked, and the imperfect led him, under the guidance of his mentor Cedric Morris, to develop a remarkably honest approach to the painting of plants—the foundation of what would become his distinctively raw take on the naked body.

Many of the potted and garden plants Freud painted are akin to wise old friends who have seen it all but know better than to speak. Zimmerlinde, one of the plants he painted many times throughout his career, was an unofficial Freud family emblem. Originally grown in Vienna by the artist’s famous grandfather, Sigmund, cuttings of the plant were passed on to family members as a living keepsake.

Lucian Freud: Plant Portraits emphasizes the importance of the domestic space as an opportunity to rethink our relationships with plants and the roles they play in our everyday lives. Never reduced to passive aesthetic objects, in Freud's work, plants can teach us to fine-tune our attention, observation, and connection to the world around us. Throughout the history of Western art, plants were relegated to the background—lush fillers or theatrical sceneries – and they very rarely, if ever, took center stage. Today it appears clear that this visual marginalization of the natural world was the symptom of a broader cultural malaise —a growing alienation from the natural world that is in part responsible for today’s environmental degradation. It is in this context that reconsidering man’s relationship with the vegetal world is more important than ever.

This exhibition is therefore a timely invitation to re-learn how to look at plants beyond the traditional lenses of the symbolic reductionism of religious painting and the objectifying gaze of science. Between these opposing approaches there lies a valuable opportunity to explore a more personal and intimate relationship that can only unfold in enclosed places like gardens or in the privacy of our homes: a closeness that defines one’s life, memories, and the passing of time.

The exhibition was positively received by critics and it was chosen by The Times  as "critic's pick of the week" and also named one of the "best exhibitions in London" by House & Gardens.

Honorable mentions have appeared in Artists and Illustrators Magazine / A Little Bird / Galerie / Gardens Illustrated / The Arts Society Magazine (5-page commentary on selected paintings by Giovanni Aloi) / The Week / Insider Art / Art Quarterly / RA Magazine /  The Daily Telegraph /  World of Interiors / The Evening Standard / Harper's Bazaar / The Independent / The New Statesman / The Observer.

The exhibition was reviewed in The Financial Times, The Arts Newspaper, The Spectator, Country Life (in print only), Country Town & Life, and Il Sole 24 Ore (in print only).

Interviews
Aloi has been interviewed in numerous publications both online and in print. In 2013, Aloi was interviewed by the vegetarian and vegan culture website The Discerning Brute. The 2016 Spring issue of international art magazine Esse opened with an interview to Giovanni Aloi titled 'Beyond Zoocentrism: An Interview with Giovanni Aloi'. There the author discusses the main issue and opportunities involved in the representation of animals in contemporary art and openly discusses the limitations of the animal studies academic field. In the same year, Aloi was interviewed by the online art and culture website Bad at Sports by Curator Caroline Picard. In this interview, Aloi discusses his research turn towards plants in contemporary art. Aloi was interviewed about his 2018 book Speculative Taxidermy by Cecilia Novero for the Philosophy website Aesthetics for Birds. In 2021, Aloi was interviewed with Andrew Yang for WLPN 105.5FM about Earthly Observatory by Brian Andrews and Jesse Malmed.
More recently, Aloi was interviewed by art historian Robert Enright in Border Crossings, issue 159: 'Human/Nature'.

Publishing

Books
 Art & Animals (2011: IB Tauris)
 Antennae 10: A Decade of Art and the Non-Human (2017: Forlaget 284 and Antennaeproject)
 Speculative Taxidermy: Natural History, Animal Surfaces, and Art in the Anthropocene (2017: Columbia University Press)
 Animal: Exploring the Zoological World -consultant and co author- (2018: Phaidon)
  Botanical Speculations: Plants in Contemporary Art (2018: Cambridge Scholars)
 Why Look at Plants? The Botanical Emergence in Contemporary Art (2018: Brill)
 Lucian Freud Herbarium (2019: Prestel)
 Flower: Exploring the World in Bloom -co-author- (2020: Phaidon)
 Posthumanism in Art and Science: A Reader -co-editor- (2021: Columbia University Press)
 Bird: Exploring the Winged World -co-author- (2021: Phaidon)
 Ocean: Exploring the Marine World -co-author- (2022: Phaidon)

Journals and editorial
Since 2007, Aloi has been the founder and editor in chief of Antennae: The Journal of Nature in Visual Culture.

Antennae: is a peer-reviewed academic journal on the subject of "nature" in contemporary art. The Journal publishes academic texts with interviews, fiction, artist statements, and portfolios.

Between 2008 and 2013, Aloi was London Editor of Whitehot Magazine founded by artist and writer Noah Becker. Aloi has written numerous reviews of shows held in the UK, Italy, and the US between 2008 and 2017.

Since 2016, with curator and writer Caroline Picard, Aloi is co-editor of the University of Minnesota Press series Art after Nature.

Aloi has also published in many academic and non-academic journals, newspapers, and magazines. Most notably, Lo Sguardo: Rivista di Filosofia, Art and Research, Journal of Visual Art Practice, Apollo, Esse,; The Guardian, Flash Art, Art Monthly, and many more.

A selection of texts by Aloi can be accessed here: https://saic.academia.edu/GiovanniAloi?from_navbar=true

References 

Italian art historians
1976 births
Alumni of Goldsmiths, University of London
School of the Art Institute of Chicago faculty
Sotheby's people
Italian expatriates in the United Kingdom
Italian expatriates in the United States
21st-century Italian historians
Italian male writers
Italian art curators
Italian art critics
Academic journal editors
Alumni of the University of the Arts London
Living people